Michael Andersson (born 4 March 1967) is a Swedish former road cyclist who was a professional rider from 1995 to 2001. He competed three times at the Summer Olympics (1992, 1996 and 2000). Andersson is a three-time winner of the Tour of Sweden. Andersson started in the Giro d'Italia two times, and in the Vuelta a España four times; the only Grand Tour he finished was the 1995 Vuelta a España.

Major results

1990
 2nd Grand Prix de France
 5th Chrono des Herbiers
1991
 1st  Overall Tour of Sweden
1st Stage 1b
1992
 1st  Overall Tour of Sweden
1st Stages 1b (ITT) & 5 (ITT)
1993
 National Road Championships
1st  Time trial
2nd Road race
 1st Paris–Évreux
 4th Overall Tour of Sweden
 9th Chrono des Herbiers
1994
 1st  Time trial, National Road Championships
 1st  Overall Cinturó de l'Empordà
1st Stage 2
1995
 1st  Overall Rapport Toer
1st Stage 6 (ITT)
 1st  Overall Giro del Capo
1996
 1st  Overall Tour of China
1st Stage 3
 1st Stage 3a (ITT) Tour of Sweden
 2nd Overall Peace Race
1st Stage 3
 9th Overall Ronde van Nederland
1997
 1st  Time trial, National Road Championships
 1st Tour de Berne
 7th Overall Vuelta a la Comunidad Valenciana
1998
 National Road Championships
1st  Time trial
3rd Road race
 4th Overall Tour of Sweden
1999
 1st  Time trial, National Road Championships
 2nd  Time trial, UCI Road World Championships
 3rd Overall Ringerike GP
1st Stage 3
 9th Overall Tour of Sweden
2000
 1st  Time trial, National Road Championships
 1st  Overall Tour of Sweden
1st Stage 2
 1st Scandinavian Open Time Trial
 5th Overall Istrian Spring Trophy

References

External links
 

1967 births
Living people
Swedish male cyclists
Cyclists at the 1992 Summer Olympics
Cyclists at the 1996 Summer Olympics
Cyclists at the 2000 Summer Olympics
Olympic cyclists of Sweden
People from Höganäs Municipality
Sportspeople from Skåne County
20th-century Swedish people
21st-century Swedish people